Qardio, Inc. is an American technology company that specializes in heart health monitoring products. It was founded by Marco Peluso and Rosario Iannella in early 2012.

Qardio's first product, QardioArm, is a wireless blood pressure monitor that connects with Apple's Health app; it received FDA 510(k) clearance in June 2014.

At CES 2015, Qardio announced two new products, QardioBase, a smart scale and body analyzer, and QardioMD, a medical dashboard for doctors. QardioBase became available for sale in November 2015.

Qardio launched the second generation of its smart scale, Qardio Base 2, in September 2017.

QardioCore ambulatory ECG/EKG monitor received CE marking in August 2017.

Qardio was selected as "Small Business of the Year" at the 2018 Entrepreneur Awards by Consumer Tech Association.

QardioCore ambulatory ECG/EKG monitor received FDA 510(k) clearance in February 2021.

See also 

 ApiJect Systems
 Vacuactivus
 MAKO Surgical Corp.

References

External links
 

Companies based in San Francisco
Weight loss
Internet of things companies
Medical device manufacturers
Wearable devices
Medical technology companies of the United States